Dro or DRO may refer to:

Places

 Dro, Trentino, a commune in Trentino, Italy
 Durango-La Plata County Airport (IATA airport code "DRO")
 San Leandro, a city just south of Oakland, California

People

 Drastamat Kanayan, an Armenian general known as Dro
 Edwige-Renée Dro, Ivorian writer, translator and literary activist
 Young Dro, an American rapper

Organizations

 Dro Records, Discos Radioactivos Organizados
 Dro (Georgian newspaper), a Georgian newspaper
 U.S. Immigration and Customs Enforcement Office of Detention and Removal

Technology

 Dielectric resonator oscillator
 Digital read out, a precision measuring instrument used in machinery and metalworking
 Distant Retrograde Orbit, a highly stable lunar orbit
 Dro, slang for  hydroponically-grown marijuana
 Dynamic Range Optimizer, a setting on some digital cameras

Other uses

 Darwin Reconnaissance Orbiter, a fictional spacecraft from Alien Planet
 Debt relief order, a form of bankruptcy in England and Wales
 Disaster relief operation